Peter James Bossley (born 1950) is a New Zealand architect based in Auckland, most recognised for his role leading the design team for the Museum of New Zealand Te Papa Tongarewa. Bossley was an adjunct professor at the Unitec Institute of Technology School of Architecture.  He has received numerous awards, including the New Zealand Institute of Architects (NZIA) Gold Medal in 2012 for outstanding contributions to the practice of architecture.

Early life and education
Bossley was born in Nelson, New Zealand in 1950 and attended Nelson College in  1962, followed by his final years at Christchurch Boys' High School.

He initially trained as an architectural technician gaining a NZCD (Arch) in 1974, and then attended the University of Auckland, graduating with BArch (Hons) in 1977.

Career
As a young architect, Bossley set up a practice with fellow graduates a year after completing his studies. The firm was first called Pete Bossley Architects, and then became Bossley Cheshire Architects, a joint practice with Pip Cheshire from 1984 to 1988. In 1989 Bossley Cheshire merged with Jasmad and Gibbs Harris to form Jasmax, of which Bossley was a director from 1989 to 1996. In 1997/8 he undertook the role of adjunct professor at the newly established Unitec School of Architecture, and continued to lecture there for many years.  In 1996 Pete Bossley Architects was reestablished. In 2012 a new company, Bossley Architects, was formed.

Architectural style and projects
While studying architecture, Bossley demonstrated an unorthodox personal style, and a strong empathy towards a building's natural environment.  These aspects are apparent in some of Bossley's most well-known residential designs such as the Waterfall Bay House, the Brown Vujcich House, and the Okitu House, all of which were award-winning residential designs.   Bossley's residential designs are characterized by innovative structural elements, bright colour accents, strong geometry, and dramatic individuality.  Bossley recently designed the pavilion holiday accommodation in Hawke's Bay, New Zealand, a structure that has the distinction of being located adjacent to a house designed by acclaimed Māori architect John Scott.

Notable works
The Heatley House, Bay of Islands (1997) 
Museum of New Zealand Te Papa Tongarewa, Wellington (1998)
McCahon artists retreat, Titirangi, Auckland (2005)
New Zealand Maritime Museum extension, Auckland (2011)

Awards
Bossley and his practice have received over 40 New Zealand Institute of Architects awards, and the House of the Year Award sponsored by Home Magazine twice – first for the Heatley House, Moturua in 1998, and second for the Beach Retreat, Bay of Islands in 2004. In 2012 Bossley was awarded the New Zealand Institute of Architects Gold Medal in 2012 for outstanding contributions to the practice of  architecture. He is also a Fellow of the New Zealand Institute of Architects.

Publications
One Year Drawn , Point Publishing, 2019
Pete Bossley Architects, The New Zealand Architectural Publications Trust, 2005
Te Papa, An Architectural Adventure, Te Papa Press, 1998

References

External links 
Pete Bossley A NZ Architect unique OE RNZ
Book review: One Year Drawn by Pete Bossley Architecture NZ
From Court to Camp Architecture NZ 
NZIA Gold Medal Winner: Pete Bossley, Architecture Now
The Surprising Pete Bossley The New Zealand Herald
John's House pavilion in Hawke’s Bay, New Zealand
Bossley Architects' website

1950 births
Living people
People from Nelson, New Zealand
People educated at Nelson College
People educated at Christchurch Boys' High School
University of Auckland alumni
New Zealand architects
Recipients of the NZIA Gold Medal
Fellows of the New Zealand Institute of Architects